Kaiserslautern High School, (formerly known as Rhine High School or Kaiserslautern American High School) also known as “K-Town” or simply “KHS” is a Department of Defense (DoD) operated international school in Kaiserslautern, Germany. The school, which serves over 800 students with 68 full-time educators (11:1), is located on Illinois Place in Vogelweh.

KHS is part of the DoDEA (Department of Defense Education Activity) as well as DoDDS (Department of Defense Dependents Schools) system. KHS is located in the Kaiserslautern District, one of the six European school districts run by DoDEA, and is one of the largest DoDDS schools by population in Europe. KHS serves students of the Kaiserslautern Military Community. With approximately 50,000 American inhabitants, KMC is the largest community of Americans outside the United States.

Shortly after the development of Western Area Command (WACOM) in 1952, when Americans took over the western area of Germany from the French, KHS was housed in a converted apartment building. On March 12, 1953, the school moved into an old hospital building and expanded continuously over the years.

From 1953 to 1958, the school included a dormitory for approximately 150 French and German students. The school was originally known as Rhine High, not being referred to as "KAHS" until the early sixties, and "KHS" fairly recently. The school grew quickly, in 1982 KHS (with an enrollment of more than 1600 students) was the largest military-operated high school outside the continental US.

Today, Kaiserslautern High School's enrollment has increased due to the relocation of military forces in Europe.  Nevertheless, KHS is known for providing excellent education and has a graduation rate of over 85%. When compared to other DoDEA schools, KHS ranks first in standardized test scores. With an annual tuition of approximately $26,000, KHS is also a rather expensive institution (due to being considered a private school) . However, dependents of the military, Department of Defense contractors, NATO members and retired military dependents are exempt from paying. 

KHS is fully accredited by the North Central Association for Accreditation (NCAA) and AdvancEd/COGNIA. The school now falls under district accreditation with The Europe East district. Every five years the school is visited by AdvancEd/COGNIA to assess the success of the school's individual school improvement plan. The professional and auxiliary staff members at the school complete an in-depth report which addresses one affective and one cognitive area that the school has chosen to address in an outcomes-based school improvement plan. This self-study is submitted to the accrediting bodies for their review and evaluation.

In 2012, Barriett Smith replaced Jennifer Beckwith as principal. Smith transferred from Ramstein High School, one of the largest schools in the DoDDS system. Smith transferred to [unknown] and was replaced by Jackie Ferguson. Ferguson was Principal for one year (2019-2020), after which she transferred to become Kadena AB Community Superintendent. She was replaced by Jason James, starting in fall 2020.

Campus
KHS currently comprises one main building with four different wings from A1-D2.  Attached to the school is the raider gym as well as a workout/weight room.

Along with the gym, the school also has a tennis court, a baseball/softball field, a football stadium, a shooting range for JROTC, and music rooms with practice rooms; for their orchestra, Band, choir, piano and other music classes.

Schedules
KHS runs on a two-day block schedule (red: 1-4, and white: 5-7 + advisory), each day having four classes 85 minutes long. The first period starts at 8:20 AM and instructional periods end at 3:00 PM each day. 
All students are required to take four years of English, four years of mathematics, three years of science, three years of a social-studies-based course, two years of computer technical education, two consecutive years of a foreign language, one year of fine arts, three semesters of physical education, and one semester of health. The current graduation requirement is a GPA of 2.0 as well as 26 credits.

Note that the schedule has undergone drastic changes during the Covid-19 pandemic.

Demographics
 Seniors 128
 Juniors 176
 Sophomores 169
 Freshmen 199
 Staff 72

Sports
During the school year, KHS sports teams compete in many competitions against schools in the DoDEA Europe East District  and other non-DoD related schools. All teams compete in the European Championships at the end of each season.
Fall season (September – November)
Golf (boys, girls)
Volleyball (girls)
Football (boys, girls)
Cross Country (boys, girls)
Tennis (boys, girls)
Cheerleading (boys, girls)
Swimming (boys, girls)
Winter season (November – February)
Basketball (boys, girls)
Cheerleading (boys, girls)
Wrestling (boys, girls)
Swimming (boys, girls)
Spring season (March–May)
Soccer (boys, girls)
Track and Field (boys, girls)
Baseball (boys)
Softball (girls)

Feeding Schools
Vogelweh Elementary School
Kaiserslautern Elementary School
Kaiserslautern Middle School

Notable alumni
 Alonzo Babers, Two-time Olympic gold medalist
 Boris Byrd, NFL player
 Robert Keeley (instrument maker), guitar effects pedal manufacturer
 Brett Paesel, Author / actress
 Scott Ritter, United Nations Weapons Inspector

Notable guest speakers
Robert Gates, 22nd United States Secretary of Defense, spoke at the Graduation ceremony for the 2010 graduating class
Josh Simpson, professional soccer player, formerly on the local team 1. FC Kaiserslautern spoke at the school several times
Luis Robles, professional soccer player, formerly on the local team 1. FC Kaiserslautern spoke at the school several times and assisted with the school's boys soccer team
Chuck Yeager, spoke to the graduating class of 1988
Umut Balli, spokesman for the Republican People's Party (Turkey)
Gen. Sir John Hackett, author of The Third World War: August 1985, spoke at the school between 82-85

References

External links
Official website
Kaiserslautern High School FBLA

High schools in Germany
American international schools in Germany
Schools in Rhineland-Palatinate
Educational institutions established in 1953
Department of Defense Education Activity
1953 establishments in West Germany
Boarding schools in Germany